CITIC 21CN Company Limited (Public, HKG:0241) is a Hong Kong-based investment holding company.

History
CITIC 21CN is an integrated information and content service provider. CITIC 21CN's principal activities comprise telecommunication and information value-added services, the provision of product identification, authentication and tracking system (PIATS), system integration and software development.

CITIC 21CN has three operating divisions: telecommunications/information valued-added services, the provision of product identification, authentication, tracking system (PIATS), and system integration and software development. Telecommunications/information value-added services provide telecommunications/information value-added services; PIATS business is an operation of a platform for PIATS, and system integration and software development provides system integration and software development.

CITIC 21CN's subsidiaries include CITIC 21CN Telecom Company Limited and CITIC 21CN (China) Technology Company Limited.

Alibaba Group and Yunfeng Capital acquired a 54.3% controlling stake in the company for HK$1.33 billion (US$171 million) in January 2014. In September 2014, the company changed its name to AliHealth (Alibaba Health Information Technology Limited).

References

External links
 AliHealth (Chinese)

Alibaba Group